Delta Lloyd Group was a Dutch insurer with operations in the Netherlands, Belgium and Germany. It consisted of Delta Lloyd, OHRA,  ABN AMRO Verzekeringen and a few minor banks. The company was the sixth-largest insurer in the Netherlands, with a market share of approximately 8% before it was acquired by NN Group in 2017.

Up until the merger, Delta Lloyd was owned by the Dutch foundation Nuts OHRA (5%) and publicly traded (95%). Previously, it had been owned by Aviva. On 23 December 2016, competitor NN Group reached an agreement to acquire Delta Lloyd for 2.5 billion euro.

History
The earliest predecessor of Delta Lloyd, the Hollandsche Societeit van Levensverzekeringen, was founded in 1807. In 1967, it merged with the Amsterdamsche Maatschappij van Levensverzekeringen and was renamed Delta. And in 1969, Delta merged with NedLloyd (not to be confused with the shipping company of the same name). In 1973, all shares in Delta were bought by the British firm Commercial Union (now part of Aviva). In 1999, Delta Lloyd merged with OHRA, the resulting company being renamed to Delta Lloyd Group in 2002. In 2016, Delta Lloyd discontinued as such after being acquired by NN Group.

Initial public offering 
The Delta Lloyd Group officially went public on the NYSE Euronext Amsterdam on 3 November 2009. Delta Lloyd made 38–42% of its shares public, with its major shareholder Aviva reducing its ownership from 92% to 50–54%. Delta Lloyd's other previous shareholder, Nuts OHRA, retained its 8% stake. In July 2012 and January 2013, Aviva sold its stake, making the group 95% publicly traded.

Delta Lloyd Netherlands

Delta Lloyd 

Delta Lloyd formed the core of the Delta Lloyd Group. It offered savings accounts, insurance and financial planning.

OHRA 
OHRA was formed in 1925 and originally known as Onderlinge ziektekostenverzekeringsfonds van Hoogere RijksAmbtenaren (Mutual health insurance for senior civil servants).

ABN AMRO Verzekeringen 
ABN AMRO Verzekeringen is a joint venture between ABN AMRO and Delta Lloyd, giving Delta Lloyd the exclusive right to sell insurance through ABN AMRO offices. It had a revenue of €900 million in 2006. For Delta Lloyd, this joint venture represented a vital means of selling insurances.

Delta Lloyd Health Insurance 
Delta Lloyd was only a small player in the health insurance market with only 700,000 customers. Originally, Delta Lloyd tried to merge its health insurance division with Agis and Menzis, but the deal fell through, thus necessitating Delta Lloyd to sell its health insurance division to CZ Group, effective 1 January 2008.

Delta Lloyd Bank 
Delta Lloyd also offered limited banking products, such as savings accounts and mortgages.

Delta Lloyd Belgium and Germany 
Delta Lloyd was also active in Belgium and Germany. In Belgium, the company offered life insurance and collective insurance. In Germany, Delta Lloyd stopped signing new contracts in 2010.

References

External links 
 

 

Aviva
Insurance companies of the Netherlands
Companies based in Amsterdam
Financial services companies established in 1807
Financial services companies disestablished in 2017
Dutch brands
1807 establishments in the Netherlands
Companies formerly listed on Euronext Amsterdam
2017 mergers and acquisitions